In pharmacology the term agonist-antagonist or mixed agonist/antagonist is used to refer to a drug which under some conditions behaves as an agonist (a substance that fully activates the receptor that it binds to) while under other conditions, behaves as an antagonist (a substance that binds to a receptor but does not activate and can block the activity of other agonists).

Types of mixed agonist/antagonist include receptor ligands that act as agonist for some receptor types and antagonist for others or agonist in some tissues while antagonist in others (also known as selective receptor modulators).

Synaptic receptors 
For synaptic receptors, an agonist is a compound that increases the activation of the receptor by binding directly to it or by increasing the amount of time neurotransmitters are in the synaptic cleft. An antagonist is a compound that has the opposite effect of an agonist. It decreases the activation of a synaptic receptor by binding and blocking neurotransmitters from binding or by decreasing the amount of time neurotransmitters are in the synaptic cleft. These actions can be achieved via multiple mechanisms. A common mechanism for agonists is reuptake inhibition, where the agonist blocks neurotransmitters from reentering the pre-synaptic axon terminal. This gives the neurotransmitter more time in the synaptic cleft to act on the synaptic receptors. Conversely, antagonists often bind directly to receptors in the synaptic cleft, effectively blocking neurotransmitters from binding.

At the alpha adrenoceptors, (R)-3-nitrobiphenyline is an α2C selective agonist as well as being a weak antagonist at the α and α subtypes.

Agonist-antagonist opioids 

The best known agonist-antagonists are opioids. Examples of such opioids are:
 pentazocine, agonist at the kappa (κ) and sigma (σ) and has a weak antagonist action at the mu opioid receptor (μ)
 butorphanol, partial agonist at μ- and a pure agonist at κ-opioid receptor and antagonist activity at the delta opioid receptor (δ)
 nalbuphine, κ-agonist/μ-antagonist analgesic

Agonist–antagonist opioids usually have a ceiling effect – over particular dose they don't increase their potency.  Hence agonist–antagonist opioids have a lower addiction potential but also lower analgesic efficacy and are more likely to produce psychotomimetic effects.

Agonist–antagonist opioids that block delta while activating mu opioid receptors produce analgesia without the development of tolerance.

See also 
 Competitive antagonist
 Inverse agonist
 Partial agonist

References 

Pharmacodynamics